Matt Roth may refer to:
 Matt Roth (American football) (born 1982), American football player
 Matt Roth (actor) (born 1964), American actor